The 1915 Washington and Lee Generals football team represented Washington and Lee University during the 1915 college football season. Ted Shultz was captain. The team also included Cy Young and Johnny Barrett. Barrett ran 90 yards on Cornell.

References

Washington And Lee
Washington and Lee Generals football seasons
South Atlantic Intercollegiate Athletic Association football champion seasons
Washington and Lee Generals football